Dixon Reservoir, also known as Dixon Lake, is a small man-made reservoir in the north of Escondido, California. It has been regularly noted to produce the largest kind of largemouth bass in the world.

Dixon Lake is considered a popular place for picnics, camping, and fishing. The State of California Department of Fish and Wildlife granted the lake an Aquaculture Permit; fishing licenses are no longer required. The city stocks different types of fish throughout the year, including bass, bluegill, carp, catfish, crappie, and trout.

Description
Dixon Reservoir is a small man-made reservoir created by the construction of the Dixon Reservoir Dam. Dixon Reservoir is in the city of Escondido, California, in San Diego County. As of September 2020, areas to fish are open to the public, at pre-marked spots. Along with fishing and picnicking, camping has been a popular recreational activity at Dixon Lake with 44 campsites.

History
Dixon Reservoir was constructed in 1971 after a water shortage act was passed a decade before. It was built during the peak of recreational fishing in San Diego, with the plan of creating a good fishery and recreational facility. Dixon Reservoir rose to fame in the 2000s after a series of big bass catches. It has been regularly noted to produce the largest kind of largemouth bass in the world. Beginning in 2001, when a  largemouth bass was caught. In 2003, the same largemouth bass was caught weighting , now nicknamed "Dottie".

Weather

Dixon Reservoir has a hot-summer Mediterranean climate, like most of San Diego. In the summer the weather is hot, while in the winter the weather is cool and wet. Because of the Reservoir's inland setting it is considerably warmer than coastal cities. The yearly precipitation averages around  but may vary year to year. Most precipitation takes place between November through March.

References

External links
Dixon Lake website

Escondido, California
Parks in San Diego County, California
Reservoirs in San Diego County, California